Wrestling was contested at the 2017 Asian Indoor and Martial Arts Games in Ashgabat, Turkmenistan from 24 
September to 26 September 2017. The competition took place at Ashgabat Main Indoor Arena.

Medalists

Men's freestyle

Men's Greco-Roman

Women's freestyle

Medal table

Results

Men's freestyle

57 kg
24 September

61 kg
25 September

65 kg
24 September

70 kg
25 September

74 kg
24 September

86 kg
25 September

97 kg
24 September

125 kg
25 September

 Ahmed Salah of Iraq originally finished 16th, but was disqualified after he tested positive for Methasterone.

Men's Greco-Roman

59 kg
26 September

66 kg
26 September

71 kg
26 September

75 kg
26 September

80 kg
26 September

85 kg
26 September

98 kg
26 September

130 kg
26 September

Women's freestyle

48 kg
24 September

53 kg
25 September

58 kg
25 September

63 kg
25 September

69 kg
24 September

75 kg
25 September

References 

 Wrestling Results Book

External links
 Official website

2017 Asian Indoor and Martial Arts Games events
Asian Indoor and Martial Arts Games
2017